Ronald Cooper (born May 26, 1958) is a former NASCAR driver. In seventy-two career Busch Series starts, Cooper recorded one win and one career top-10 points showing.

1988

Cooper made his debut with his own #56 Buick, and started 1988 with the intent to run all the races. Cooper would only qualify for 25 of the 30 races, but it was a solid season nonetheless. After finishing 18th in his series debut at Rockingham, Cooper earned his first top-10 at South Boston, finishing 6th. Cooper would earn three other top-10 finishes on the year, highlighted by his first career top-5 with a fifth at Dover. His qualifying was solid, too, with an outside pole at Lanier being the best of six top-ten starts. Despite missing five races, and not finishing five more, Cooper finished an impressive 15th-place points finish in the final tally.

1989

Cooper's best career year came in 1989, when he recorded eighth place in the series. The highlight of the season had to be his first (and only) career victory, as he paced the field at Lanier, his home track. However, Cooper was solid elsewhere, recording four top-fives and ten top-tens. Eight top-ten qualifying efforts also helped the driver to the final points effort, but five DNFs hindered Cooper's effort to move up any higher.

1990

Cooper's team began to run out of money, as it was a small family-owned team. Cooper would only make eight starts as a result in 1990. It did not help the team's situation that they struggled early, crashing out of three out of the first four races of the year. The team was solid in the other four, finishing no worse than 16th in the final four starts, highlighted by a fifth place at Dover. The financial situation did not improve and Cooper's team folded following Dover.

1993

Cooper got his team to restart for three races in 1993, driving the #56 Johnny Cotton Chevy late in the season. The races were solid for Cooper, as he finished 16th, 14th and then 12th at Atlanta.

1994

Cooper's #56 team was back for only seven more starts in 1994. Cooper, whose career had been made of saving his equipment, only managed to finish two races on the year. However, they were both solid as he recorded a pair of sevenths at Rockingham and Charlotte. Cooper's team, though, had to fold again, and Cooper has not raced in NASCAR since.

Motorsports career results

NASCAR
(key) (Bold – Pole position awarded by qualifying time. Italics – Pole position earned by points standings or practice time. * – Most laps led.)

Busch Series

References

External links
 

1958 births
Living people
People from Barrow County, Georgia
Sportspeople from the Atlanta metropolitan area
Racing drivers from Georgia (U.S. state)
NASCAR drivers
ARCA Menards Series drivers